George J. Forster (1905–1988) was Mayor of Madison, Wisconsin. He held the office from 1950 to 1955.

References

Mayors of Madison, Wisconsin
1905 births
1988 deaths
20th-century American politicians